Bucculatrix latella is a moth in the family Bucculatricidae. It was described by Annette Frances Braun in 1918. The species is found in North America, where it has been recorded from California and Arizona.

References

Natural History Museum Lepidoptera generic names catalog

Bucculatricidae
Moths described in 1918
Moths of North America
Taxa named by Annette Frances Braun